Carl Spongberg (May 21, 1884 in Idaho Falls, Idaho – July 21, 1938 in Los Angeles, California) was a pitcher in Major League Baseball for the Chicago Cubs. He was the first Idaho-born player in MLB history.

References

External links
Baseball-Reference

1884 births
1938 deaths
Major League Baseball pitchers
Chicago Cubs players
Baseball players from Idaho
People from Idaho Falls, Idaho